Grimm is an American dark fantasy crime drama television series created by Stephen Carpenter, David Greenwalt and Jim Kouf. The show ran, on NBC, from October 28, 2011, to March 31, 2017. The series follows homicide detective Nick Burkhardt (David Giuntoli) who learns that he is a descendant of a group of hunters known as "Grimms", who fight to keep humanity safe from the supernatural creatures of the world. 

A total of 123 episodes of Grimm aired over six seasons.

Series overview

Episodes

Season 1 (2011–12)

Season 2 (2012–13)

Season 3 (2013–14)

Season 4 (2014–15)

Season 5 (2015–16)

Season 6 (2017)

Webisodes

Bad Hair Day

Love Is in the Air

Meltdown

Ratings

References

External links

Episodes
Grimm
Grimm

fr:Saison 1 de Grimm
it:Episodi di Grimm (prima stagione)